Nottingham Council House is the city hall of Nottingham, England. It is a Grade II* listed building.

History
The Council House was commissioned to replace the former Nottingham Exchange. It was designed by Thomas Cecil Howitt in the Neo-Baroque style and built between 1927 and 1929.

Housed within the belfry, is the affectionately-named 'Little John' hour bell – the deepest toned clock bell in the United Kingdom, weighing over  – whose strike can be heard for a distance of seven miles.

The foundation stone (behind the left-hand lion as you approach the building) was laid by Alderman Herbert Bowles (Chairman of the Estates Committee), on 17 March 1927. The total cost of the building at the time was £502,876. By the time the bill was finally cleared in 1981, the total including interest was £620,294. The building was officially opened by the Prince of Wales (later King Edward VIII and subsequently the Duke of Windsor) on 22 May 1929.

The building has staged many high-profile occasions with royalty, statesmen and women, and stars of the stage and screen. Both the FA Cup in 1959, and the European Cup in 1979 and 1980, have been held aloft from its balcony.

Since Nottingham City Council relocated councillors’ offices to Loxley House in 2010, the Council House is seldom used for day-to-day administrative functions.  From April 2011, the building also now serves as the chief Register Office for Births, Marriages and Deaths in the City.

Exterior

The Council House and Exchange Buildings (to the rear) are constructed of Portland Stone from the same quarry used by Sir Christopher Wren for St. Paul's Cathedral in London.

The terrace overlooking the Old Market Square has eight massive columns, above which, are 21 figures representing the activities of the Council, also modelled by Joseph Else FRBS, the Principal of the Nottingham School of Art from 1923 to 1939. The frieze behind depicts traditional local crafts such as bell founding, mining and alabaster carving.

Interior
The interior of the building is elaborately decorated:

Ground Floor

The Entrance Hall has columns, walls, floor and made from Italian marble. The City Arms are inlaid as a mosaic in the centre of the floor. Bronze plaques on the left (northern) wall list the Honorary Freemen of the City of Nottingham; whilst those on the right (southern) wall list the City’s Honorary Aldermen. Another plaque commemorates the opening of the building in 1929, including the golden key used by the Prince of Wales to open the doors. In a nod to modernity, a final plaque displays the building’s energy efficiency rating.
A grand sweeping marble staircase leads up to the reception rooms on the first floor. At the top of the stairs is a bronze cast figure entitled ‘Welcome’, by Sir William Reid Dick. It features a female figure with arms outstretched, welcoming visitors to the Council House. Presented to the City by Sir Julien Cahn the statue was unveiled on 10 February 1931.

First Floor

The Ballroom, is similar in style to one at the Palace of Versailles, with gilt embellished columns and a highly decorated ceiling. The fine parquet sprung floor is made from oak, walnut and ebonised pearwood.  French windows lead out onto the famous balcony overlooking the Old Market Square.
The Dining Room has Ancona walnut panelling and an Italian marble fireplace, and is generally for smaller events. The room is dominated by a fine portrait of Queen Elizabeth II by John Townsend, presented to the City by Mr Lewis Colton in 1970.
Display cabinets house the City’s ceremonial maces and silverware gifts given to the City Council by visiting dignitaries. There is also a display giving details of the ship . A matchstick model of the Council House building invites donations from visitors to the Lord Mayor’s charities.
The Lord Mayor’s Suite includes the Parlour, panelled in carved walnut, with an adjoining Sitting Room featuring oak panelling recovered from Aston Hall, Derbyshire.

Second Floor
The Committee Room contains a horseshoe table in walnut veneer, and is where most executive board meetings were held before the Council moved meetings to Loxley House on Station Street in 2010.
The Sheriff’s Parlour (originally that of the Lady Mayoress) is decorated in Adam style.

Third Floor
The Tea Room holds up to 30 people.  The large walnut table was originally in the Boardroom at Raleigh Industries’ headquarters building (also designed by Howitt).
The Members’ Room has facilities for councillors, including newspapers and journals, computers and a television. An archive of minutes of City Council meetings is available in glass-fronted bookshelves.
The Council Chamber takes up the remainder of the third floor. The chamber’s walls are of Ancona walnut, with fabric wall panels containing seaweed to aid the acoustics. A separate entrance from the Exchange Arcade (Smithy Row side) gives direct access to the public galleries.
There are rooms which can be used by councillors (since 2010, most city councillors have been based at the newly acquired Loxley House on Station Street) and the Conservative opposition group on the Council has an office outside the Council Chamber.

Dome

The most striking visual element of the building, and in itself an iconic symbol of the City. An ornate cupola stands on the apex of the dome.

To the rear of the clock face is the clock mechanism, which was manufactured and installed by William W. Cope of the famous Cope clockmaking family. There is only one dial on the west front of the building. The clock is still wound by hand once per week. 

Four bells provide Westminster Chimes on the quarter hours. The hour bell has been named 'Little John' since the building opened. The bell was cast in 1928, by the world-famous bellfounders John Taylor & Co. of Loughborough. At  in weight, 'Little John' is the 4th heaviest founded by John Taylor & Co. and the 6th heaviest in the British Isles. The E tone is the deepest, for a non-swinging clock bell in the British Isles. The new chimes and strike were not universally popular and following complaints from member of the public about them ringing throughout the night, the council agreed in July 1929 that the chimes should not strike after 11.00pm until 6.15am, and from September the strike was also suspended at night between 11.00pm and 7.00am.

The Exchange (Exchange Arcade)
The ground floor is predominantly an upmarket fashion-dominated shopping mall – now called ‘The Exchange’ in honour of the Nottingham Exchange – having had an image makeover in 2005. The original name of Exchange Arcade is still used by many local people however. Retailing space was included in the design to fund the Corporation’s construction of the building, during the Great Depression and remained under council control until sold in 1985 and redeveloped as a shopping centre.

This part of the building has been in private hands since that time, and is currently owned by a Pension Fund. Each shop has its own basement showroom or storage facilities, deliveries being made via an underground roadway, served by a vehicular lift on Cheapside. This service area was originally the fresh produce hall, and received natural light via pavement lights in the floor of the arcade above. The locations of those lights can still be seen, marked by the 1985-vintage terracotta tile strips which replaced them, interspersed between the York stone paving slabs. The paved areas were replaced in 2014 with identical York stone.

Painted murals underneath the Council House dome feature:
The Danes capturing Nottingham in 868:
William the Conqueror ordering the building of the castle in 1068;
Robin Hood and his Merry Men;
King Charles I raising his standard at the start of the Civil War in 1642.

Each mural was the work of local artist Noel Denholm Davis. The artist used local celebrities as models. Thus T. Cecil Howitt himself appears in the guise of William the Conqueror’s surveyor, and Notts County F.C. goalkeeper Albert Iremonger as Little John.  The inscription around the base of the dome reads: “The Corporation of Nottingham erected this building for counsel and welcome, and to show merchandise and crafts”.
The condition of these murals has deteriorated in recent years, largely through the ingress of water. The Robin Hood mural was particularly severely damaged in this way. In June 2018 Nottingham City Council finished a complete restoration of the damaged murals in a process which took about three months.

Statuary

Much of the external statuary is by Joseph Else (1875–1955), Principal of the Nottingham School of Art (now part of Nottingham Trent University).  Else was responsible for the famous lions guarding the entrance, for the frieze above the Ballroom windows (representing ancient local industries such as bellfounding and alabaster) and for the figures in the principal façade’s pediment (depicting the arts and public service).  A pub overlooking the Square is now named after Else.

The Lions

Created by Joseph Else, the two art-deco lions each weigh  and stand guard on either side of the entrance steps. They are similar in design to the lions used to publicise the British Empire Exhibition of 1924/25. Joseph Else named them, ‘Agamemnon’ and ‘Menelaus’, after the elder son and younger son of King Atreus of Mycenae, from Greek mythology. Alternative colloquial names are, ‘Leo’ (Left) and ‘Oscar’ (Right). The colloquialism, ‘Meet you by the lions’ (often the left lion), became part of the local dialect from the beginning of their existence, and is in fact, frequently demonstrated by the sight of people meeting and greeting nearby on a regular basis.

Sculpture Groups around the Dome
These groups were created by Joseph Else and three former students of the School of Art.  All the sculptors were born and raised in Nottingham.

'Commerce' by Joseph Else. The 2 male figures are pushing a ship, carrying a female holding a caduceus.  This is at the Exchange Walk (Natwest Bank) corner.
'Civic Law' by Charles L J Doman.  A smiling central female figure holds a sceptre in her right hand and book in her left.  At her feet are the figures of Law (holding a fasces and Justice (carrying a sword).  This group is at the Long Row / King Street corner.
'Prosperity' by James Woodford.  Strikingly Art-Deco, a female holds a sword.  At her feet are a mother and baby, and a female holding the fruits of the earth.  This group is at the Long Row East corner, (best seen from outside the Yorkshire Bank).  Woodford is the most famous of the sculptors outside his native Nottingham, having created the heraldic Queen's Beasts for the 1953 Coronation Pavilion at Westminster Abbey.  He also had commissions for the liner , the RIBA building in London, as well as the famous statue of Robin Hood at Nottingham Castle.
'Knowledge' by Ernest Webb.  A female figure (in striking 1920s hat) holds a globe. The two male figures sit at her feet, one holding a book, the other a pair of compasses.

Architectural criticism
Howitt himself was in no doubt that the use of classical lines would mean that it would not look dated in a few years’ time.

A scathing criticism came from Nikolaus Pevsner in his Buildings of England: Nottinghamshire (published in 1951);

“Not much can be said in defence of this kind of neo-Baroque display at a date when the Stockholm Town Hall was complete and a style congenial to the C20 established. Wren has to answer for much, once the connection between Greenwich and this dome (via the Old Bailey?) is noted. The Ionic columniation is no more inspiring or truthful than the interiors. The only positive interest lies in the plan of the building. Its centre is a shopping arcade of great height with a glass roof, and shops run all along the ground floor on the N and S sides.”

References

Further reading
Beckett, John and Brand, Ken: (2004) The Council House, Nottingham and the Old Market Square (Nottingham Civic Society) 
Granger, Frank: (1929) The Council House Nottingham – a review of the Council House and Exchange Buildings (City of Nottingham Estates Committee)
Harwood, Elain: (2008) Nottingham – Pevsner Architectural Guide (Yale University Press) 
Scoffham, Ernie: (1992) A Vision of the City: The Architecture of TC Howitt (Nottinghamshire County Council Leisure Services)

External links

Government buildings completed in 1929
Government buildings with domes
Buildings and structures in Nottingham
City and town halls in Nottinghamshire
Baroque Revival architecture
Tourist attractions in Nottingham
Grade II* listed government buildings
Grade II* listed buildings in Nottinghamshire
1929 establishments in England